Lewis G. "Lou" Spicer (November 12, 1922 – June 23, 1981) was an American professional basketball player who spent one season in the Basketball Association of America (BAA) as a member of the Providence Steam Rollers during the 1946–47 season. He attended Syracuse University.

BAA career statistics

Regular season

External links
 

1922 births
1981 deaths
Basketball players from New York (state)
Providence Steamrollers players
Syracuse Orange men's basketball players
American men's basketball players
Forwards (basketball)